Tupelo High School is the only public high school in Tupelo, Mississippi. The campus consists of fourteen buildings, including a Performing Arts Center, separate buildings for social studies, English, math, sciences, fine arts, and a self-contained grade-9 building. The current student population of the school is about 1,995. As of 2014–2015, it is the largest enrolled public high school in the state of Mississippi. The class of 2015 consisted of 438 graduates. The school offers a curriculum containing 160 Carnegie units, 24 of which are Advanced Placement.

Tupelo High School is a two-time National Blue Ribbon School award winner, having won the award in 1983-1984 and another in 1999–2000.

The school's boundary includes the vast majority of Tupelo and a portion of Saltillo.

Notable alumni 
 Adam Grace, musician
 Alex Carrington, professional football player 
 Chad Bumphis, professional football player
 Chris Stratton, professional baseball player
 Frank Dowsing, first black football player at both THS and Mississippi State
 Jarious Jackson, professional football player
 John Dye, actor
 Mikky Ekko, singer-songwriter
 Rae Sremmurd, hip-hop duo
 Tamika Whitmore, retired professional basketball player
 Tan White, professional basketball player  
 Todd Jordan, professional football player and Tupelo mayor

Student life 
As of 2022- 2023, Tupelo High School offers extracurricular activities, including football, slowpitch and fastpitch softball, cross country, volleyball, swimming, basketball, soccer, bowling, archery, baseball, wrestling, golf, tennis, cheer, and track and field. In addition to athletics, the school offers other clubs, such as theatre, a school newspaper, arts, and mock trials.

References

External links 
 Tupelo High School home page. Tupelo High School on 2008–02–06.
 About Our School. Tupelo High School. Retrieved on 2008–02–06.

Public high schools in Mississippi
Buildings and structures in Tupelo, Mississippi
Schools in Lee County, Mississippi